The 2009 Vodafone Rally de Portugal was the 43rd running of the Rally Portugal and the fourth round of the 2009 World Rally Championship season. It took place between 2-5 April 2009 and consisted of 18 special stages.

The event was won by Citroën's Sébastien Loeb ahead of Ford's Mikko Hirvonen and Loeb's teammate Dani Sordo. Norwegian drivers Petter Solberg, his brother Henning Solberg and Mads Østberg took the following positions. The last point-scoring places went to Federico Villagra and Khalid al-Qassimi, after Evgeny Novikov crashed out from eighth place on stage 15, and fifth-placed Matthew Wilson and now eighth-placed Conrad Rautenbach both retired on the penultimate stage.

The early leader Jari-Matti Latvala had a big crash on the fourth stage, rolling his Ford Focus WRC 17 times over a distance of 150 metres. Marcus Grönholm, who came out of retirement to contest the rally in a Prodrive-prepared Subaru Impreza WRC, crashed out from fourth place on stage eight.

Results

Special stages

References

External links 

 Official site

Portugal
Rally de Portugal
Rally Portugal